Loffenau is a town in the district of Rastatt in Baden-Württemberg in Germany.

Geography
Loffenau is located within a tributary valley of the Murg River in the western slopes of the northern Black Forest.

History
Loffenau enjoys a rich history, spanning well over seven centuries.

Local attractions
A major point of interest in Loffenau is the Protestant Heilig Kreuz (Holy Cross) Church. The 550-year-old medieval church contains both well-preserved original and restored 19th-century frescos. Among various images of saints and apostles, visitors can admire the well known image of the 'Host Mill.' An easily accessible viewing platform is located within the church. Another major local attraction is the Teufelsmühle (Devil's Mill) which overlooks the town from a lofty altitude of 2979 ft (908m).

Politics
The town is a member of the Association of Administrations of Cities. Gernsbach

Local government
The local government consists of twelve elected members and a mayor. (five FWG; four SPD; three CDU)

twinning
The town is twinned with:
  Caderousse, Département Vaucluse, Region Provence-Alpes-Côte d'Azur, France since 1985
  Kreischa district Weißeritzkreis, Sachsen, Germany since 1990
  Montefelcino, Region Marche, Province Pesaro and Urbino, Italy since 1999
  Steinbourg, Départment Bas-Rhin, Region Grand Est, France.

Famous people
Chefs Günter Seeger (Michelin starred, Mobil 5 star in the United States) and Harald Wohlfahrt (Michelin starred) were born in Loffenau.

Meryl Streep's paternal ancestors lived in Loffenau, and one was elected mayor. Her great-great-grandfather Gottfried Streeb immigrated to the U.S. from Loffenau.

References

Rastatt (district)
Württemberg